Storytelling is the fifth studio album by Scottish indie pop band Belle and Sebastian. It is the score to the Todd Solondz movie Storytelling. Belle and Sebastian experienced many problems in communication with Solondz while scoring the film, and as such only about six minutes of their music was actually used in the movie. The album contains five tracks that are recorded dialogues. The instrumental track "Fuck This Shit" uses the prosody of the title phrase in a number of different keys but never the words themselves. The album was the band's final release on Jeepster, as they went on to sign a deal with Rough Trade the following year.

Track listing

Charts

References

2002 soundtrack albums
Belle and Sebastian albums
Film soundtracks
Albums produced by Tony Doogan
Jeepster Records soundtracks